Ayeah Games, Inc. was a social games developer located in Boston. The company was founded in January, 2010 by Douglas Levin and released its first Facebook game entitled FanSwarm on October 31, 2010. It was credited as the first "social reality" game on Facebook, using real-time news to determine a celebrity's buzz.

History
In January, 2010, the company was founded by Douglas Levin. On August 16, 2010, Ayeah Games received seed funding from a Boston-based angel fund. On October 31, 2010, Ayeah Games released FanSwarm on Facebook.

FanSwarm
FanSwarm was the first "social reality" game on Facebook and incorporates real news into the game play. The basic premise of the game was to "back" real life celebrities and earn points based on how much news they produce, whether it is good or bad. The game uses an algorithm that tracks news volume from Twitter and Facebook to determine how many points each celebrity is worth every day. Similar to fantasy football, users chose which stars to back and earn points based on those selections. It has been referred to by the CNN as Fantasy Football for Marquee readers.

References

External links
 Ayeah Games
 FanSwarm Facebook Game
 Official FanSwarm Twitter

Video game development companies
Video game companies of the United States